Armatocereus laetus is a species of Armatocereus from Peru.

Description
Armatocereus laetus grows columnar tree-like, branched above the ground and reaches growth heights of 4 to 6 meters. A short massive trunk is formed. The gray-green shoots are columnar and erect. Four to eight ribs are present. The six to twelve initially brown spines become whitish or grayish with age.

The white flowers are 7 to 8 centimeters long and up to 5 centimeters in diameter. The green fruits are heavily spined.

References

External links
 
 

laetus
Flora of Peru